Apex is an annual esports tournament held in New Jersey that is focused on Super Smash Bros. The event's first incarnation was in 2009 with Jesus "Jman" Fernandez as the champion of Super Smash Bros. Melee and Elliot "Ally" Carroza-Oyarce as champion of Super Smash Bros. Brawl. Each year the event grew with more competitors entering. Apex 2014 garnered 629 entrants and was the 2nd largest tournament for Melee at the time after EVO 2013. Though the tournament initially focused on Brawl, the feature game has since switched to Melee due to its popularity. In 2010, an event for Super Smash Bros. for the Nintendo 64 was added. In 2014, the fan modification of Brawl, Project M was added for singles only. Project M has recently been removed as an official event out copyright concerns under Nintendo of America sponsorship and Third Party relations.

Apex 2015 was officially sponsored by Nintendo of America and was the largest tournament for Super Smash Bros. in history until it was surpassed by EVO 2015. Apex has been described as the "Super Bowl of 'Super Smash Bros.'" by Ben Lindbergh of sports website Grantland.

History
Apex was founded in 2009 by Johnathan Lugo, known by his alias "Alex Strife", as a Super Smash Bros. tournament. The tournament also hosts side events which include fighting games such as Street Fighter, Marvel vs. Capcom, Tekken, and others.

2009
Apex 2009 was hosted at the Clarion Hotel Palmer Inn in Princeton, New Jersey. The tournament featured Super Smash Bros. Brawl, Melee, and Brawl+. Melee singles was won by Jman and doubles was won by Mew2King and Jman. Brawl singles was won by Ally and doubles was won by Ally and Mew2King. Brawl+ singles was won by ChuDat. In Brawl crews, MD/VA won.

2010
Apex 2010 was hosted in New Brunswick, New Jersey at Rutgers University–New Brunswick's College Avenue Student Center. It featured Melee, Brawl, and Super Smash Bros. 64. It also featured the Brawl mods Brawl+ and Brawl-.

2012
After a one-year hiatus, Apex 2012 returned to New Brunswick, New Jersey at Rutgers University's College Avenue Student Center. It featured Melee, Brawl, and 64. Melee Singles was won by Armada and doubles by Armada and Mew2King. Brawl was won by Otori in singles and Otori and Kakera in doubles. Smash 64 was won by SuPeRbOoMfAn and doubles was won by Isai and Nintendude. In Melee USA v the World, USA won by a massive 8 stocks. Brawl was set to have a crew battle, but it was cancelled due to time constraints. The tournament was criticized because Brawl did not have enough setups, causing delay in pool matches and necessitating the cancellation of the crew battle.

2013
Apex 2013 was again hosted in the College Avenue Student Center at Rutgers University featuring Melee, Brawl, and 64. It also featured USA v The World crew battles for both Melee and Brawl. In addition, Melee had The Links v The Stinks crew battle, in which a team of seven Links challenged team of six well known low tier mains and were joined by "The Final Boss," Kage, to a crew battle.

2014
Apex 2014 was hosted at the DoubleTree hotel in Somerset, New Jersey featuring Melee, Project M, Brawl, and 64.

2015
Apex 2015, which ran from January 30 to February 1, included Super Smash Bros. Melee, Super Smash Bros. for Wii U, Super Smash Bros. Brawl, Super Smash Bros. 64, Pokémon Omega Ruby and Alpha Sapphire, Ultra Street Fighter IV, Guilty Gear Xrd, Ultimate Marvel vs. Capcom 3, Killer Instinct. It was initially hosted at Clarion Hotel Empire Meadowlands in Secaucus, New Jersey and featured the first Melee tournament with over a thousand entrants with 1037 players participating. Super Smash Bros. for Wii U included over 800 entrants.

The tournament was officially sponsored by Nintendo and included a playable demo of Splatoon. Apex dropped Brawl fan mod Project M from its 2015 lineup and all of its qualifiers. Streaming for fangame, Super Smash Bros. Crusade, has also been denied. Lugo alleged he received death threats for the dropping of Project M from some members of the community. In January 2015, Lugo announced he was stepping down from Apex after multiple media reports alleging sexual harassment by tournament attendees.

After a fire alarm was accidentally set off on the morning of January 30, fire marshals discovered that parts of the hotel were in violation of safety codes. The marshals removed access to the ballrooms, which had a partially collapsed roof. The main tournament was delayed for a day and was moved 40 miles away to the Garden State Convention Center in Somerset, New Jersey.

2016
After the controversies surrounding the 2015 event, there were doubts over the future of the Apex tournament. However Andre "Bifuteki" Augustin announced that the event would continue under his leadership. Apex 2016 was the seventh edition of the Apex series which took place on June 17–19, 2016 under the new management of the Bifuteki crew. The event was considerably smaller the previous incarnation and even had to cancel its Brawl event due to low turnout.

References

External links
 

Super Smash Bros. tournaments
Recurring sporting events established in 2009
Events in New Jersey
2009 establishments in New Jersey